Moussodougou is a department or commune of Comoé Province in southern Burkina Faso. Its capital lies at the town of Moussodougou. According to the 1996 census the department has a total population of 9,407.

Towns and villages

References

Departments of Burkina Faso
Comoé Province